Los Gabriel: Cantan a México (English The Gabriel: Sing to Mexico) is a compilation album by Mexican singers Ana Gabriel and Juan Gabriel. After the success of the romantic album Los Gabriel… Simplemente Amigos, edited in 2007, Sony BMG Latin presents one more collection of their hits in the regional Mexican genre.

Track listing
Tracks:
 La  - Juan Gabriel
 Y Aquí Estoy - Ana Gabriel
 Se Me Olvidó Otra Vez - Juan Gabriel
 Ahora - Ana Gabriel
 La Farsante - Juan Gabriel
 Amigo Mio (Homenaje A Juan Gabriel) - Ana Gabriel
  Pobre Amigo - Juan Gabriel
 Tú Lo Decidiste - Ana Gabriel
 No Vale La Pena - Juan Gabriel
 A Pesar de Todo - Ana Gabriel
 Te Sigo Amando - Juan Gabriel
 Huelo A Soledad - Ana Gabriel
 Canción 187 - Juan Gabriel
 Volver, Volver - Ana Gabriel
 Adorable Mentirosa - Juan Gabriel
 México Lindo y Querido - Ana Gabriel

Charts

Weekly charts

Year-end charts

References

Ana Gabriel compilation albums
Juan Gabriel compilation albums
2008 compilation albums